Ambrose M. Castellano is an American businessman and politician serving as a member of the New Mexico House of Representatives from the 70th district. Elected in 2020, he assumed office on January 19, 2021.

Early life 
A native of Las Vegas, New Mexico, Castellano graduated from West Las Vegas High School.

Career 
Prior to entering politics, he worked as a general contractor and rancher. He served on the board of trustees of Luna Community College and as a member of the West Las Vegas School Board.

He is a member of the Democratic Party. In October 2020, a complaint was filed against Castellano, alleging that he did not live within the boundaries of the 70th district. The complaint also alleged that Castellano used a post office box in Serafina, New Mexico as his permanent residence.

In the June 2020 Democratic primary, Castellano narrowly defeated Anita Gonzales. In the November general election, he defeated Republican nominee Nathan Dial. He assumed office in 2021, succeeding Tomás Salazar.

References 

Hispanic and Latino American state legislators in New Mexico
Living people
Businesspeople from New Mexico
People from Las Vegas, New Mexico
Democratic Party members of the New Mexico House of Representatives
Year of birth missing (living people)